The Eura is a river in south-western Finland in Satakunta region. Its source is Lake Pyhäjärvi and it flows through the municipalities of Eura and Eurajoki before discharging into Bothnian Sea.

The total length of the Eura is 53 kilometres (33 mi). It has eleven rapids and three small hydroelectric power plants with an installed capacity of 0.1–0.5 MW. Its longest tributary is the 23-kilometre-long Köyliö which originates at Lake Köyliö.

The Eura has been an important waterway since the Viking Age, connecting the fertile hinterland to the Baltic Sea. Bronze and Iron Age settlements in Eura were the most largest and most remarkable in Finland.

References

External links 

Rivers of Finland
Eurajoki basin
Landforms of Satakunta